State of Divinity is a Hong Kong television series adapted from Louis Cha's novel The Smiling, Proud Wanderer. It was first broadcast on TVB in Hong Kong in 1996.

Cast
 Note: Some of the characters' names are in Cantonese romanisation.

 Jackie Lui as Ling-wu Chung
 Fiona Leung as Yam Ying-ying
 Timmy Ho as Lam Ping-chi
 Cherie Chan as Ngok Ling-san
 He Meitian as Yee-lam
 Wong Wai as Ngok Bat-kwan
 Lily Li as Ning Chung-chak
 Pau Fong as Fung Ching-yeung
 Law Lok-lam as Yam Ngor-hang
 Henry Lo as Dong-fong Bat-bai
 Lau Kong as Heung Man-tin
 Sue Tam as Lam Fung-wong
 Kwan Ching as Yu Chong-hoi
 Chan Hung-lit as Tso Lang-sim
 Tam Yat-ching as Tin-mun
 Suen Kwai-hing as Mok Dai
 Cheng Lui as Muk Ko-fung
 Cheung Ying-choi as Fong-ching
 Tam Chuen-hing as Chung-hui
 Wah Chung-nam as Monk Bat-kei
 Alice Fung as Nga Por-por
 Cheng Bak-lun as Tin Bak-kwong
 Chan Chi-hung as Wong Yuen-ba
 Law Lan as Ting-yat
 Leung Bo-ching as Ting-ching
 Leung Shun-yin as Ting-man
 Cheng Siu-ping as Yee-wo
 Wan Seung-yin as Yee-ching
 Leung Suet-may as Yee-yuk
 Wayne Lai as Lau Ching-fung
 Newton Lai as Kuk Yeung
 Law Kwok-wai as Lut Chuk-yung
 Chan Tik-hak as Tung Bak-hung
 Leila Tong as Kuk Fei-yin
 Chan Chung-kin as Wong Chung-kung
 Leung Yam-kei as Hak Bat-chi
 Lee Lung-kei as Tok Bat-yung
 Kwong Chor-fai as Dam Ching-sang
 Chan Wing-chun as Lo Tak-lok
 Tang Yu-chiu as Leung Fat
 Lee Ka-keung as Luk Dai-yau
 Kong Ming-fai as Ying Bak-law
 Cho Kai as Fung Bat-ping
 Sit Chun-kei as Sing-bat-yau
 Chu Tit-wo as Lam Tsan-nam
 Wong Hoi-sam as Lam Tsan-nam's wife
 Leung Siu-tik as Ting-min
 Fong Kit as Luk Bak
 Cheung Hon-ban as Fai Ban
 Lee Hoi-sang as Chung Chan
 Mak Tsi-wan as Tik-yau
 Lau Siu-kwan as Yu Yan-yin
 Chan Min-leung as Ka Yan-kwai
 Wong Wai-tak as How Yan-ying
 Kwok Chuk-wah as Hung Yan-hung
 Mak Ka-lun as Yu Yan-ho
 Wong Kai-tak as Law Yan-kit
 Cheung Hung-cheung as Tin-chung
 Leung Ming-wah as Tin-chung
 Lui Kim-kwong as Yuk-kai-tsi
 Koi Ngok as Yuk-mo-tsi
 Shek Wan as Yuk-yam-tsi
 Ho Pik-kin as Fong-sang

External links
State of Divinity at the Chinese Movie Database
State of Divinity official page on TVB website

TVB dramas
1996 Hong Kong television series debuts
1996 Hong Kong television series endings
Works based on The Smiling, Proud Wanderer
Hong Kong wuxia television series
Television series set in Imperial China
Television shows based on works by Jin Yong